Alex Griffiths may refer to:
 Alex Griffiths (cricketer) (born 2002), Welsh cricketer
 Alex Griffiths (environmentalist) (1911–1998), Australian beekeeper and environmentalist